De Kift is a Dutch musical ensemble that was formed in 1988.  Their music might be best classified as fanfare with influences of rock and punk. The band is closely connected to and befriended with The Ex with whom they did several projects together.

The band won the Dutch Zilveren Harp award in 2001.

Band members 
 Ferry Heijne (vocals, trombone, trumpet, guitar)
 Jan Heijne (trumpet)
 Han Hulscher (trumpet)
 Patrick Votrian (trombone, tuba)
 Mathijs Houwink (double bass)
 Wim ter Weele (drum, guitar, vocals)
 Pim Heijne (guitar, banjo)
 Marco Heijne (vocals)

Discography 
 Hoogriet (2020)
 Bal (2017)
 Bidonville (2014)
 Brik (2011)
 Hoofdkaas (2008)
 7 (2006)
 De Kift 2005 (2004 / 2006)  (Mon Slip, Warner Music France / North East Indie Records)
 Vier Voor Vier (2003)
 Koper (2001)
 Vlaskoorts (1999)
 Gaaphonger (1997)
 Krankenhaus (1993)
 Yverzucht (1989)

References

Dutch bio on The Dutch Rock & Pop Institute website
Version Information  on the discogs website

External links 
 website De Kift
 De Kift on MySpace
 Franz Ferdinand covers De Kift (Dutch)
 De Kift celebrates anniversary and is awarded large subsidy (Dutch
 Biography of De Kift
 De Kift receives large subsidy (Dutch)
 De Kift collaborates with Franz Ferdinant (Dutch)
 Franz Ferdinand and Calexico join cover project De Kift
 Electric Dutch band De Kift in Moscow
 De Kift tours France (Dutch)

Musical groups from North Holland
Musical groups established in 1988